Discoverer 23, also known as KH-5 9016A, was a USAF photographic reconnaissance satellite under the supervision of the National Reconnaissance Office (NRO) which was launched in 1961. It was a KH-5 ARGON satellite, based on an Agena-B. It was the second KH-5 mission to be launched, and the second to end in failure.

Launch
The launch of Discoverer 23 occurred at 19:21:08 GMT on 8 April 1961. A Thor DM-21 Agena-B rocket was used, flying from launch pad 75-3-5 at the Vandenberg Air Force Base. Upon successfully reaching orbit, it was assigned the Harvard designation 1961 Lambda 1.

Mission
Images were recorded onto  film, and ejected aboard a Satellite Return Vehicle, SRV-521. Due to a problem with Discoverer 23's attitude control system, the SRV ended up boosting itself into a higher orbit rather than deorbiting. Discoverer 23 decayed from orbit on 16 April 1962, followed by the SRV on 23 May 1962.·

References

Spacecraft launched in 1961
Spacecraft which reentered in 1962